Misopates orontium, known as weasel's snout, is a herbaceous annual plant in the family Plantaginaceae. It is a native of disturbed ground in Europe. It is also naturalised as a weed in other parts of the world such as North America. The pink flowers resemble a miniature snapdragon and are followed by a hairy green fruit which is said to resemble a weasel's snout.

Common names include linearleaf snapdragon, weasel's snout, lesser snapdragon or calf's snout. Past common names have included lesser snapdragon and corn-snapdragon.

Taxonomy
Alternatively considered as the type species of section Orontium, genus Antirrhinum.

References

External links
 Comprehensive profile for Misopates orontium from the website Arable Plants - A Field Guide

orontium
Plants described in 1753
Taxa named by Carl Linnaeus